Bunche is a surname. Notable people with the surname include:

Malcolm Bunche (born 1991), American football offensive guard 
Ralph Bunche (1903–1971), American political scientist, academic and diplomat 
Ralph J. Bunche III (born 1979), American lawyer and diplomat, grandson of above

See also
Bunch (surname)